Mantidactylus charlotteae is a species of frog in the family Mantellidae. It is endemic to Madagascar and found in the eastern part of the country in the coastal rainforest belt between Marojejy in the north and possibly as far as Andohahela in the south.

Description
Males measure  and females  in snout–vent length. The body relatively slender. The head is long with rounded snout. The tympanum is distinct. The limbs are slender. The fingers are without webbing whereas the toes are webbed. The back is reddish brown in colour and without markings. There are reddish dorso-lateral glandular ridges. The flanks are blackish, with a sharp border towards the dorsum.

Habitat and conservation
It is a terrestrial species that is often found near streams where. It breeds in streams but lays its eggs on land.

Mantidactylus charlotteae is a very abundant species, although it is suspected to be decreasing because of habitat loss and deterioration. These threats are driven by agriculture, timber extraction, charcoaling, spread of eucalyptus, livestock grazing, and expanding human settlements. However, it occurs in several protected areas.

References

External links
 
 

charlotteae
Endemic frogs of Madagascar
Amphibians described in 2004
Taxa named by Frank Glaw
Taxa named by Miguel Vences
Taxonomy articles created by Polbot